The Sheffield Wednesday F.C. Player of the Year is an annual award presented to players of Sheffield Wednesday on behalf of the club's fans to recognise an outstanding contribution to the previous season. The award was first presented in 1969 following the 1968–69 season. As of the 2019–20 season, the award is presented to the winner of a public vote on the Sheffield Wednesday official website.

Explanation of list

Appearances
Appearances and goals are listed for the season for which the player won the award. Only competitive fixtures are included in the statistics. These include:
Premier League and English Football League (including play-off matches in the latter)
Official European competitions – UEFA Cup, Intertoto Cup, Inter-Cities Fairs Cup, Anglo-Italian Cup
Official domestic competitions – FA Cup, EFL Cup, EFL Trophy, Full Members' Cup
Friendly matches, exhibition games, and pre-season tournaments are excluded from the figures.

Table headers
Season – Seasons are scheduled to run from August until May of the following year, with the award usually being presented in April or May for the preceding season.
Level – The league and level at which the season was played. Division One was the highest level in English football until the formation of the Premier League in 1992–93, after which Division One became the second tier. In 2004–05 the Championship was formed as the new second tier with League One and League Two making up the remainder of the English Football League.
Nationality – The player's officially recognised FIFA nationality. A player may have been born in one country but represented another nation through family ancestry.
Apps – The number of games played in the season including any substitute appearances.
Goals – The number of goals scored in the season.
Notes – Further information on the award.

Winners

Wins by player

Players who have won the award more than once.

Wins by playing position

Wins by nationality

References

Player of the Year
Player of the Year
Association football player of the year awards by club in England
Association football player non-biographical articles